The Bouvier des Flandres is a herding dog breed originating in Flanders, Belgium. They were originally used for general farm work including cattle droving, sheep herding, and cart pulling, and nowadays as guard dogs and police dogs, as well as being kept as pets. The French name of the breed means, literally, "Cow Herder of Flanders", referring to the Flemish origin of the breed. Other names for the breed are Toucheur de Boeuf (cattle driver), Vlaamse Koehond (Flemish cow dog), and Vuilbaard (dirty beard).

History

The monks at the Ter Duinen monastery were among the earliest known dog breeders in Flanders. The bouviers bred by them are recorded as having been bred from imports such as Irish wolfhounds and Scottish deerhounds with local farm dogs, until a breed considered to be the predecessor of the modern Bouvier des Flandres was obtained. This became a working dog able to perform tirelessly, herding and guarding cattle and even pulling cargo carts, thanks to its strength and temperament, and to withstand the local weather conditions due to its thick coat. The breed's practical use became antiquated after the invention of the automobile, when cattle were more practically transported by trucks.

Historically, the ear cropping and tail docking could have been done for practical reasons, avoiding accidental amputations in the course of work, or to indicate the dog was working stock and not a pet subject to taxation.

Up until the early 20th century, the breed was not completely defined, with three variants: Paret, Moerman or Roeselare, and Briard. Conflict between the proponents of these three variants held the breed's development back. In 1912 and 1913, several local kennel clubs recognized standards for Bouviers; however they usually had different standards for the Roeselare and other variants.

World War I nearly caused the breed to disappear, due to the devastation that came over its region of origin and the fact that the dogs were used for military purposes. Indeed, Nic, a male trained as a trench dog who served during the war and was a perennial winner at dog shows after the war, is considered to be the founder of the early Bouvier des Flandres breed.

A unified Bouvier des Flandres standard was created in 1936 by a joint French-Belgian committee. However, World War II again endangered the breed's existence. Due to these setbacks, progress was slowed, and it was not until 1965 that the Fédération Cynologique Internationale (FCI) breed standard, as agreed to by several minor kennel clubs, was adopted.

Description

Appearance

The Bouvier is a powerfully built, compact, rough-coated dog of rugged appearance. It gives the impression of size and strength without clumsiness or heaviness. Perhaps its most notable feature is the impressive head which is accentuated by a heavy beard and mustache. Although the practice of cropping both ears and tail are now mostly cosmetic, tails were originally docked to prevent injuries caused by herding and cart-pulling. The practice of cosmetic docking is currently opposed by the American Veterinary Medical Association. In the area of origin (Flanders, Belgium) cropping was made illegal in 2006. The weight of males ranges from 80 to 120 pounds or 36 to 54 kilograms, slightly smaller for females. They are powerfully built, with a thick double coat, which can be fawn, black, grey brindle, or "pepper and salt" in color. Bouviers are sometimes considered non-shedding, but in fact do lose hair, like all dogs. Most of the hair that they lose is caught within the double coat which results in matting. They require weekly brushing and combing to maintain the coat. In addition to weekly brushing, the coat should be trimmed approximately every 3–5 weeks if it is to be a show dog. Trimming requires practice to achieve the proper look.

Temperament

Bouviers des Flandres are rational, gentle, loyal, and protective by nature. The breed's particular blend of characteristics makes them good family pets, as well as keen guard dogs. Unlike some animals bred for aggressive nature and power, the Bouvier possesses sophisticated traits, such as complex control, intelligence, and accountability.

The Bouvier des Flandres is an obedient dog with a pleasant nature. They look intimidating, but are actually calm and gentle. They are enthusiastic, responsible, even-tempered, and fearless, and are excellent guard and watchdogs that are easy to train. This breed learns commands relatively fast. However, Bouviers get bored easily and learn best when repetition is limited.

They require well-balanced training that remains consistent in nature. Without being harsh, it is important to consistently make the dog aware that the owner will remain the boss. This breed needs an experienced owner to prevent dominance and over-protectiveness problems. These dogs poorly trained can become inappropriately dominant towards humans. An un-socialized Bouvier can become fearful and pose a problem when introduced to new situations in which they do not feel comfortable.

Bouviers should be socialized well, preferably starting at an early age, to avoid shyness, suspiciousness, and being overly reserved with strangers (although the breed is naturally aloof with strangers). Protection of the family when danger is present is not something that needs to be taught, nor is it something one can train out of them. The dog will rise to the occasion if needed. A good family dog, the Bouvier likes, and is excellent with, children. The Bouvier is very adaptable and goes about its business quietly and calmly. Obedience training starts when they are young. Their behavior depends on the owner's ability to communicate what is expected, and on the individual dominance level of the dog. They are usually good with other dogs if they are raised with them from puppyhood. Dominant individuals can be dog-aggressive if the owners are not assertive and do not communicate to the dog that fighting is unwanted. Slow to mature both in body and mind, the Bouvier does not fully mature until the age of 2–3 years.

Activities
Bouviers des Flandres can compete in dog agility trials, carting, obedience, dog showmanship, Schutzhund, tracking, and herding events. Herding instincts and trainability can be measured at noncompetitive herding tests. Bouviers exhibiting basic herding instincts can then be trained to compete in herding trials.

Notable Bouviers des Flandres

 Belco, the dog that accompanied Edmee Bowles to America when she fled occupied Belgium and who was the foundation stud of her kennel Clos du Cereberes at Belco Farm in Pennsylvania.
 Soprano de la Thudinie, the post-war foundation stud of Justin Chastel's de la Thudinie kennel in Belgium and the most prominent ancestor of the modern type of Bouvier des Flandres.
 Lucky, owned by United States President Ronald Reagan and First Lady Nancy Reagan. 
 Patrasche, the dog found by a boy named Nello in A Dog of Flanders, is often asserted to be a Bouvier des Flandres.
 Max and his mate Madchen and their puppies, fictional characters featured in W.E.B. Griffin's Presidential Agent series.
Isabelle du Monceau de Bergendal, a character within the Strike Witches series, has a Bouvier des Flandres as her familiar animal.
Gretel, a Bouvier des Flandres, is the dog of Dr. Robert Romano on ER.
Kirie, a young female Bouvier, is owned by criminal police officer Gereon Rath, the protagonist of Volker Kutscher's series of detective novels set in the 1930s Berlin. Originally belonging to a murdered Belgian actress, Kirie is adopted by Rath in  The Silent Death , the second novel in the series, and remains his companion until her death in  Olympia, the eight installment.

See also
 Dogs portal
 List of dog breeds

References

External links

 

FCI breeds
Herding dogs
Dog breeds originating in Belgium